Andrus Värnik (born 27 September 1977) is a retired Estonian track and field athlete who competed in the javelin throw. He is a World Champion, having won gold in 2005. His personal best throw of 87.83 m, set in 2003, was the Estonian record for 15 years.

Career
Värnik won his first international medal, a silver medal, in the 2003 World Championships in Athletics, throwing 85.17 m. The next year he finished sixth in the javelin contest at the Olympic Games with the result 83.25 m.

With 87.17 m he won a surprise gold medal at the 2005 World Championships in Athletics, ahead of Olympic champion Andreas Thorkildsen, defending World Champion Sergey Makarov and home favorite Tero Pitkämäki.

Personal life
In 2007, Värnik participated as a celebrity contestant on the second season of Tantsud tähtedega, an Estonian version of Strictly Come Dancing. His professional dancing partner was Kaisa Oja.

On 16 January 2010, Värnik was caught drunk driving in Tallinn. He was banned from driving for 4 months and fined 12,000 kroons.

Achievements

Seasonal bests by year
2000 – 82.16
2001 – 80.83
2002 – 85.47
2003 – 87.83
2004 – 87.58
2005 – 87.19
2006 – 84.85
2007 – 75.96
2008 – 81.11
2009 – 82.00
2010 – 74.50
2011 – 76.20

References

External links
 
 
 
 

1977 births
Living people
People from Antsla
Estonian male javelin throwers
Olympic athletes of Estonia
Athletes (track and field) at the 2000 Summer Olympics
Athletes (track and field) at the 2004 Summer Olympics
World Athletics Championships medalists
World Athletics Championships athletes for Estonia
Recipients of the Order of the White Star, 3rd Class
World Athletics Championships winners